The Kyrgyz Soviet Encyclopedia is the first Kyrgyz language general encyclopedia. Its six volumes were published in the capital city of Frunze (since renamed Bishkek) from 1976 to 1980. A supplemental volume, Kyrgyz SSR, was published in 1982 in both Kyrgyz and Russian.

Main editors 
Asanbek Tabaldiev (v. 1), Byubiyna Oruzbayeva (v. 2–6).

See also 
 Great Soviet Encyclopedia

References 

Kyrgyz-language literature
Kirghiz Soviet Socialist Republic
1976 non-fiction books
20th-century encyclopedias
National Soviet encyclopedias
Kyrgyz encyclopedias